Nicholas Yost (April 1, 1915 – December 31, 1980) was an American basketball player who played in the United States' National Basketball League for two seasons. He played for the Hammond Ciesar All-Americans between 1938 and 1940.

Yost grew up in Chicago, attended DePaul Academy for high school, then lettered in basketball at DePaul University between 1934 and 1937 before turning professional.

References

1915 births
1980 deaths
American men's basketball players
Basketball players from Chicago
Centers (basketball)
DePaul Blue Demons men's basketball players
Forwards (basketball)
Hammond Ciesar All-Americans players